Cor Z van der Flier (born 1947) is a Dutch former cricketer who played as a right-arm off break bowler. She appeared in one One Day International for the Netherlands in 1984, the team's first. Against New Zealand, van der Flier took 4/24 from her 11 overs, which at the time was the 6th best bowling figures taken on WODI debut.

van der Flier also played for the Netherlands on various tours, such as of South Africa in 1969 and England between 1977 and 1981, where they played against various club and county sides. In a match against Bedale Women in 1977, van der Flier took 5/36 and scored 67* in a 4 wicket victory.

References

External links

1947 births
Living people
Date of birth missing (living people)
Dutch women cricketers
Netherlands women One Day International cricketers
20th-century Dutch women
21st-century Dutch women